Lecocarpus darwinii is a species of flowering plant in the family Asteraceae. It is found only in Galápagos Islands, Ecuador.

References

darwinii
Flora of the Galápagos Islands
Near threatened plants
Taxonomy articles created by Polbot